In coordination chemistry, a transition metal NHC complex is a metal complex containing one or more N-heterocyclic carbene ligands.  Such compounds are the subject of much research, in part because of prospective applications in homogeneous catalysis.  One such success is the second generation Grubbs catalyst.

Historically, N-heterocyclic carbenes were thought to mimic properties of tertiary phosphines.  Many steric and electronic differences exist between the two ligands. Compared to phosphine ligands, NHC ligands' cone angle is more complex. The imidazole ring of the NHC ligand is angled away from the metal center, yet the substituents at the 1,3 positions of the imidazole ring are angled towards it. The presence of the ligand inside of the metal coordination sphere affects the metal reactivity. In terms of electronic effects, NHC are often stronger sigma donation.

Synthesis

From free NHCs
The popularization of NHC ligands can be traced to Arduengo, who reported the deprotonation of dimesitylimidazolium cation to give IMes. IMes is a free NHC that can be used as a ligand.  Other NHCs have been isolated as the free ligands. Aside from IMes, another important NHC ligand is IPr, which features diisopropylphenyl groups in place of the mesityl groups.  NHCs with saturated backbones include SIMes and SIPr.

Transmetallation of silver-NHC reagents
Usually, transition metal NHC complexes are prepared less directly.  A popular method entails transmetallation of silver-NHC complexes.  Such reagents are generated by the reaction of silver(I) oxide with the imidazolium salt.

Other methods
A third method involves decarboxylation of NHC-carboxylates.  In this approach, N-methylimidazoles react with methyl formate to give zwitterionic N,N'-dimethylimidazolium-2-carboxylate.  This zwitterion decarboxylates in the presence of metal ions to give N,N'dimethylimidazolidene-based NHC complexes.

See also
 Palladium–NHC complex

References

Organometallic chemistry
Transition metals
Coordination complexes
Coordination chemistry